Bridges to Babylon Tour '97–98 by the Rolling Stones  is a concert DVD released in December 1998. It was filmed in the TWA Dome in St. Louis, Missouri on 12 December 1997 during the Bridges to Babylon Tour 1997–1998. Featuring performances by Dave Matthews and Joshua Redman.

The concert was broadcast as a pay-per-view special. Of the 23 songs played, 4 songs were left off the DVD.  "Anybody Seen My Baby?", "Corinna" with Taj Mahal, "All About You" and "The Last Time" were also played. "Waiting On A Friend", "Corinna" and "The Last Time" from this concert were released on the live album No Security.

Track listing
 Opening
 "(I Can't Get No) Satisfaction"
 "Let's Spend the Night Together"
 "Flip the Switch"
 "Gimme Shelter"
 "Wild Horses" (featuring Dave Matthews)
 "Saint of Me"
 "Out of Control"
 "Waiting on a Friend" (featuring Joshua Redman)
 "Miss You"
 "I Wanna Hold You"
 Across the bridge (B-stage)
 "It's Only Rock 'n Roll (But I Like It)"
 "Like a Rolling Stone"
 "Sympathy for the Devil"
 "Tumbling Dice"
 "Honky Tonk Women"
 "Start Me Up"
 "Jumpin' Jack Flash"
 "You Can't Always Get What You Want"
 "Brown Sugar"
 Bows and End credits

Personnel
The Rolling Stones
Mick Jagger – lead vocals, guitar, harmonica
Keith Richards – guitars and vocals
Charlie Watts – drums
Ronnie Wood – electric guitar, backing vocals

Additional musicians
Darryl Jones – bass guitar
Chuck Leavell – keyboards, backing vocals
Bernard Fowler – backing vocals, percussion
Lisa Fischer – backing vocals
Blondie Chaplin – backing vocals, percussion
Bobby Keys – saxophone
Kent Smith – trumpet
Andy Snitzer – saxophone, organ
Michael Davis – trombone

Special guests
Dave Matthews – vocals on "Wild Horses"
Joshua Redman – saxophone on "Waiting on a Friend"

References

The Rolling Stones video albums
1998 video albums
Live video albums
1998 live albums